In physical knot theory, a knot energy is a functional on the space of all knot conformations.  A conformation of a knot is a particular embedding of a circle into three-dimensional space.  Depending on the needs of the energy function, the space of conformations is restricted to a sufficiently nicely behaved class.  For example, one may consider only polygonal circles or C2 functions.  A property of the functional often requires that evolution of the knot under gradient descent does not change knot type.

Electrical charge
The most common type of knot energy comes from the intuition of the knot as electrically charged.  Coulomb's law states that two electric charges of the same sign will repel each other as the inverse square of the distance.  Thus the knot will evolve under gradient descent according to the electric potential to an ideal configuration that minimizes the electrostatic energy.  Naively defined, the integral for the energy will diverge and a regularization trick from physics, subtracting off a term from the energy, is necessary.  In addition the knot could change knot type under evolution unless self-intersections are prevented.

Variations
An electrostatic energy of polygonal knots was studied by Fukuhara in 1987 and shortly after a different, geometric energy was studied by Sakuma.  In 1988, Jun O'Hara defined a knot energy based on electrostatic energy, Möbius energy.  A fundamental property of the O'Hara energy function is that infinite energy barriers exist for passing the knot through itself.  With some additional restrictions, O'Hara showed there were only finitely many knot types with energies less than a given bound.  Later, Freedman, He, and Wang removed these restrictions.

References

Knot theory